De Naald (English "The Needle") may refer to several monuments in the Netherlands:

 De Naald, Apeldoorn
 De Naald, Heemstede 
 The Needle of Rijswijk
 The Needle of Waterloo, in Soestdijk